BluePhoenix Solutions is a publicly traded company, headquartered in Israel, that develops and sells modernization services for legacy information technology systems. Its shares are traded on the NASDAQ Global Market exchange.  The company partners with systems integrators like IBM, Microsoft, Oracle and Dell to deliver its software and services.

Company 
BluePhoenix Solutions specializes in the modernization of corporate legacy databases and applications. The firm's automated translation platform serves as a base to provide services for clients updating legacy systems to more modern computing platforms.

History 
BluePhoenix Solutions was founded by Aaron Crystal in 1987 under the name A. Crystal Solutions. Soon afterwards Formula Systems acquired control of the company, while the founder retained some of his shares and continued to serve as the company's CEO until 1996, when its name was changed to Crystal Systems Solutions and it went public on Nasdaq under the leadership of Dan Goldstein and his brother Gad. In January 1997 the company's shares began trading on what was then the NASDAQ National Market under the symbol CRYSF. Among the company's clients were Microsoft, Synopsys and Bank Leumi. In 2003 the name Crystal Systems was changed again, this time to BluePhoenix Solutions, subsequent to a merger of Crystal Systems with Liraz Systems, of which BluePhoenix was a subsidiary. BluePhoenix functioned as a subsidiary of Formula Systems until June 2007, when Formula sold its shares in the company to international institutional investors. In 2009, BluePhoenix Solutions acquired DSKnowledge Ltd. In 2012, a new investment group appointed Matt Bell CEO.  Bell conducted a dramatic reorganization, strengthening the company's financials and refocusing on core legacy modernization solutions.

In February, 2004, BluePhoenix Solutions joined the Object Management Group (OMG), with full voting rights and the ability to submit proposals.

A project Ringmaster was promoted in 2013.

In 2014, BluePhoenix and ATERAS Complete Merger and Commence Operations as Modern Systems (details). In 2020 Modern Systems got acquired by OneAdvanced.

Management 
The company's management team in 2013 was Bell, Yuri Steinschreiber as VP of technology, Rick Oppedisano as VP of marketing and product management.

Acquisitions

See also 
 Enterprise engineering
 List of Israeli companies quoted on the Nasdaq

References 

Information technology companies of Israel
Software companies of Israel
Software companies established in 1987
1987 establishments in Israel
Companies listed on the Nasdaq
Companies listed on the Tel Aviv Stock Exchange

ca:GEN